Münchweiler am Klingbach is a municipality in Südliche Weinstraße district, in Rhineland-Palatinate, western Germany.

References

Palatinate Forest
Südliche Weinstraße